Purulia Homoeopathic Medical College & Hospital is a private homoeopathic medical college in Purulia, West Bengal, India. It was established in 1983. It offers the Bachelor of Homeopathic Medicine and Surgery (BHMS) degree course. This institution is recognized by the Central Council of Homoeopathy (CCH), Ministry of Ayush and affiliated with the West Bengal University of Health Sciences.

See also

References

1983 establishments in West Bengal
Educational institutions established in 1980
Homeopathic hospitals
Hospitals established in 1980
Hospitals in West Bengal
Universities and colleges in Purulia district
Homoeopathic Medical Colleges in West Bengal
Affiliates of West Bengal University of Health Sciences